Zemst-Bos is a village in Flemish Brabant, Belgium. It is part of the municipality of Zemst and has about 1,000 inhabitants.

Het Zwartland is a hamlet of the village.

History 
Until the late Middle Ages, the village was a large forest area. In the 13th and 14th centuries, the first large farms were built, especially created for cutting down forests in order to gain agricultural lands. In the late 18th century (1770s), the village had about 70 houses. Since the 1980s, many new houses have been built and the population has reached about 900.

Gallery 

Populated places in Flemish Brabant